Charis Fellowship, known before 2018 as the Fellowship of Grace Brethren Churches, and before 1976 under the name of National Fellowship of Brethren Churches, is a theologically conservative fellowship of Brethren churches that was founded in 1939 as a conservative split from the Brethren Church. The word charis is Greek in origin, meaning “grace.” The church traces its roots back to the Schwarzenau Brethren movement of Alexander Mack, founded in 1708 in Schwarzenau, Germany.

History
For the early history see Church of the Brethren.

The Great Schism

The Brethren (at the time called German Baptist Brethren) suffered a three-way division early in the 1880s, and the more progressive group organized the Brethren Church in 1883. Led by charismatic leader Henry Holsinger, they maintained the standard Brethren doctrines, but wanted to adopt new methods, and desired more congregational autonomy and less centralization. These more progressive Brethren moved into the direction of the mainstream of Christian evangelicalism in America. Several events in the late 19th century and early 20th century, including the Bible Conference movement, emphasis on foreign missions, and the rise of fundamentalism, affected the church. The Foreign Missionary Society of the Brethren Church was formed on September 4, 1900, in Winona Lake, Indiana.

Fundamentalism rising

But, also in the early 1900s, two different viewpoints began to emerge. As Robert Clouse writes about this event “the Progressives showed considerable agreement in what they opposed, but were less united in what they wished to create.”  The Brethren Church had rejected classical liberal theology in 1921 with "The Message of the Brethren Ministry," written by J. Allen Miller and Alva J. McClain. However the aggressive approach of fundamentalism, led by Louis S. Bauman and McClain, conflicted with the drawn out approach of traditional Brethrenism. The fundamentalists desired strongly worded statements of faith, the traditional Brethren stressed non-creedalism. The classic dispensationalist belief held by the fundamentalists largely disregarded the Sermon on the Mount as a law for an earlier age, while the traditional Brethren statement "the New Testament is our Rule of Faith and Practice" placed a high emphasis on this passage in Matthew 5–7.

Division from the Brethren Church

This tension finally erupted in 1936–37 with a growing controversy at Ashland College. Although the school was under the control of the Brethren Church, it was transitioning from a Christian denominational school to a secular school with a more regional focus. Because of a push to enlarge non-Brethren representation on the board of trustees and establish a "double standard" of conduct for regular college students and pre-seminary students, Bauman and Charles Ashman, Sr. (1886–1967) resigned from the Ashland College board of trustees on June 1, 1937. The next day, professors Alva J. McClain and Herman Hoyt were fired from Ashland Seminary due to increasing tension between the college group and the seminary group. At a prayer meeting in the home of J.C. Beal that evening Grace Theological Seminary was born, where after prayer Bauman announced "I want to give the first gift to the new school."

In the next two years two groups emerged in the Brethren Church: those sympathetic with Ashland College and those sympathetic with Grace Seminary. Traditional Brethren, in part because of their drawn out approach and in part due to their distaste for fundamentalist theology, sided with Ashland College, while the fundamentalists led by Bauman and McClain, sided with Grace Seminary. In 1939, the Grace Seminary group formed the National Fellowship of Brethren Churches. The Fellowship incorporated in 1987 as the Fellowship of Grace Brethren Churches.

Departure of the Conservative Grace Brethren

Another division occurred in 1992, involving a coalition of fundamentalist pastors who were troubled by the continuing “neo-evangelical” drift that they perceived taking root within the larger body of the FGBC, ultimately resulting in the formation of the Conservative Grace Brethren Churches, International (CGBCI).  The immediate issue of dissension concerned the question of open membership in regard to individuals who had not been baptized by trine immersion (the historic Brethren standard, which the Brethren traditionally believe is taught in the language of Matt. 28:19). The Conservative pastors (so called because they desired to “conserve” Biblical truth) ultimately saw the broader issue as one involving Biblical Fundamentalism vs. an unduly pragmatic neo-evangelicalism, and ultimately withdrew from the larger body as a matter of conviction.

The Formation of the Charis Alliance

In 2015, delegates from ministries in all the countries who associate with the Grace Brethren gathered in Bangkok. Thailand and formed the Charis Alliance. The Global Charis alliance adopted the Charis Commitment to Common Identity.  In 2016, the Fellowship of Grace Brethren Churches joined the Charis Alliance.  In 2017 the Fellowship of Grace Brethren Churches adopted an assumed business name (D.B.A.) registered in the state of Indiana.

Beliefs
Churches and ministries of the Charis Fellowship agree to cooperate harmoniously under the Commitment to Common Identity which includes a center section: "We declare that Jesus Christ, the incarnate Word of God, as revealed in the Bible, the written Word of God, is the only Savior and Lord. He is the center of our shared experience of true biblical unity." and a section connecting us with an evangelical core (The One True God; The Lord Jesus Christ; The Holy Spirit; The Bible; Humanity; Salvation; Church; Christian Life; Angels, Satan, Demons; Future Life) and a section summarizing "The Shared Commitments of our Global Movement".

Ministries
Grace College and Seminary in Winona Lake, Indiana is associated with the Fellowship of Grace Brethren Churches. Encompass World Partners (formerly Grace Brethren International Missions), CE National, Brethren Missionary Herald Company, Women of Grace USA and a variety of others are cooperating ministries of the Fellowship of Grace Brethren Churches to help fulfill their mission of making the Gospel known. The headquarters of the churches are maintained in Winona Lake, Indiana and the annual conference moves about the USA to serve the different regions of the churches.

Members

As of 2018, the Fellowship of Grace Brethren Churches is made up of over 230 churches in the United States and Canada, with an average attendance of over 43,000. There are 23 districts cooperating with the Fellowship, and more than 3000 churches have been formed outside North America.  Worldwide attendance in Grace Brethren Churches is estimated to be 600,000 people.

National conference meetings
2014 - FellowSHIFT / Vision Conference in Washington D.C at the Omni Shoreham Hotel
2015 - Flinch Conference in Newark, NJ at the Marriott Newark International Airport 
2016 - Margins Conference Margins in Toronto, Ontario, Canada (July 22-25, 2016) - 
Access 2017 - Fremont, Ohio at Grace Community Church (July 25-27, 2017) - Wrap-up article
Access 2018 - Fremont, Ohio at Grace Community Church (July 24-26, 2018) - Wrap-up article
Access 2019 - Auburn, California at Auburn Grace Community Church (July 23-25, 2019)
Access 2020 - Winona Lake, Indiana at Grace College & Theological Seminary (July 21-23, 2020) - website

References

Literature
 Frank S. Mead, Samuel S. Hill, & Craig D. Atwood: Handbook of Denominations
 David R. Plaster: Finding our Focus: A History of the Grace Brethren Church, Winona Lake, IN, 2003.
 Norman B. Rohrer: A Saint in Glory Stands: The Story of Alva J. McClain, Founder of Grace Theological Seminary, Winona Lake, IN, 1986.

External links
Charis Fellowship Web Site
Grace College and Seminary Web Site
Encompass World Partners Web Site
Grace Brethren Investment Foundation Web Site
Eagle Commission Web Site
Inspire: Charis Pastors Network web site
Women of Grace web site
CE National
BMH Books

Anabaptist denominations established in the 20th century
Brethren denominations in North America
Peace churches
Christian organizations established in 1939
1939 establishments in the United States
Fundamentalist denominations